Los Hombres las prefieren viudas is a 1943 Argentine film.

Cast

External links
 

1943 films
1940s Spanish-language films
Argentine black-and-white films
Argentine films based on plays
Argentine comedy films
1943 comedy films
1940s Argentine films